Rolf Johansson (17 October 1929 – 13 April 2004) was a Swedish wrestler. He competed in the men's freestyle flyweight at the 1952 Summer Olympics.

References

External links
 

1929 births
2004 deaths
Swedish male sport wrestlers
Olympic wrestlers of Sweden
Wrestlers at the 1952 Summer Olympics
People from Uddevalla Municipality
Sportspeople from Västra Götaland County